A general election was held in the U.S. state of Wyoming on Tuesday, November 3, 1942. All of the state's executive officers—the governor, secretary of state, auditor, treasurer, and superintendent of public instruction—were up for election. Like the 1938 elections, this year's elections were something of a mixed bag for both parties. Democratic secretary of state Lester C. Hunt successfully defeated Republican governor Nels H. Smith for re-election, but Republicans flipped the secretary of state's office in Hunt's absence. The other incumbents—State Auditor William M. Jack, a Democrat, and Superintendent Esther L. Anderson, a Republican—were re-elected, and Republicans held onto the state treasurer's office.

Governor

After defeating his predecessor, Democrat Leslie A. Miller, by a wide margin in 1938, Republican governor Nels H. Smith faced a tough challenge to his re-election in Secretary of State Lester C. Hunt, the Democratic nominee. Ultimately, Hunt narrowly defeated Smith, winning the first of his two terms as governor.

Secretary of State
Secretary of State Lester C. Hunt opted to challenge Republican governor Nels H. Smith for re-election rather than seek a third term as secretary of state, thereby creating an open seat. Susan J. Quealey, a leader in the state Democratic Party, narrowly won the primary over State Representative Raymond E. Morris. In the general election, she faced State Treasurer Mart T. Christensen, and lost to him in a landslide. Fewer than two years into Christensen's term, however, he would die in office; Governor Hunt appointed State Auditor William M. Jack as his replacement.

Democratic primary

Candidates
 Susan J. Quealy, Wyoming Democratic Party activist
 Raymond E. Morris, State Representative from Laramie County

Results

Republican primary

Candidates
 Mart T. Christensen, State Treasurer

Results

General election

Results

Auditor
Incumbent Democratic Auditor William M. Jack ran for re-election to a third term. After winning a contested Democratic primary against C. A. Johnson, a former state employee, he faced State Representative Everett T. Copenhaver in the general election. Building on his track record of decisive victories, Jack defeated Copenhaver relatively easily, winning 55% of the vote to Copenhaver's 45%. During Jack's third term, he was appointed by Governor Hunt as the successor to the late Secretary of State Mart T. Christensen, who died in office. Governor Hunt would, in turn, appoint Carl Robinson as Jack's successor.

Democratic primary

Candidates
 William M. Jack, incumbent state auditor
 C. A. Johnson, former sales tax department employee

Results

Republican primary

Candidates
 Everett T. Copenhaver, State Representative from Converse County

Results

General election

Results

Treasurer
Incumbent Republican state treasurer Mart T. Christensen was unable to seek re-election due to term limits, and instead successfully ran for secretary of state. The open seat became a contest between two former presiding officers of the state legislature: Democratic nominee Henry D. Watenpaugh, the Director of the State Office of Government Reports and the Speaker of the Wyoming House of Representatives from 1935 to 1937, and Republican nominee Earl Wright, the President of the Wyoming State Senate. Despite the strength of both candidates, Wright ended up defeating Watenpaugh comfortably, holding the office for the Republican Party.

Democratic primary

Candidates
 Henry D. Watenpaugh, Director of the State Office of Government Reports, former Speaker of the Wyoming House of Representatives

Results

Republican primary

Candidates
 Earl Wright, President of the Wyoming State Senate
 Doc Rogers, former deputy secretary of state, 1938 Republican nominee for auditor

Results

General election

Results

Superintendent of Public Instruction
Incumbent Republican superintendent of public instruction Esther L. Anderson ran for re-election to a second term. She was opposed by Democratic nominee Albert L. Keeney, the superintendent of schools in the town of Superior. Keeney proved little challenge to Anderson, who overwhelmingly defeated him for re-election and won the highest percentage of the vote of any statewide candidate in Wyoming that year.

Democratic primary

Candidates
 Albert L. Keeney, Superintendent of Superior Schools

Results

Republican primary

Candidates
 Esther L. Anderson, incumbent superintendent of public instruction

Results

General election

Results

References

 
Wyoming